École nationale des sciences géographiques (ENSG or ENSG Géomatique) a French engineering college created in 1941.

The ENSG hosts about ten initial training cycles ranging from the Technician level to Masters and Mastères Spécialisés levels, and organizes a large volume of continuing education in all areas of geomatics.

Located in Champs-sur-Marne, the ENSG is a public higher education institution. The school is a member of the Gustave Eiffel University since 1 January 2020.

See also
Institut national de l'information géographique et forestière

References

External links
 ENSG

Engineering universities and colleges in France
ENSG
Seine-et-Marne
Educational institutions established in 1941
1941 establishments in France
Geomatics organizations